Osteobrama alfredianus, the rohtee, is a species of ray-finned fish in the genus Osteobrama. It is found in the River Salween basin in south-east Asia

Footnotes

 

Alfredianus
Fish described in 1844